MPs elected in the 1796 British general election

This is a list of the 558 MPs or Members of Parliament elected to the 314 constituencies of the Parliament of Great Britain in 1796, the 18th and final Parliament of Great Britain prior to the Union with Ireland to form the United Kingdom.

The candidates returned in contested elections are listed in the descending order of the number of votes received.



By-elections 
List of Great Britain by-elections (1790–1800)

See also
1796 British general election
List of parliaments of Great Britain
Unreformed House of Commons

References

1796
1796
1796 in Great Britain
Lists of Members of the Parliament of Great Britain